The Tohoku Rakuten Golden Eagles have completed 18 seasons in Nippon Professional Baseball (NPB) since their inaugural season in 2005. The team was formed to fill the void left in the Pacific League when the Osaka Kintetsu Buffaloes and the Orix BlueWave merged into one team during the 2004 NPB realignment. Through 2022, they have played 2,545 regular season games, winning 1,150, losing 1,319, and tying 76 for a winning percentage of .466. The Eagles have also a combined record of 15–14–1 (.517) in post-season and Japan Series play. The team is based in Sendai, Miyagi Prefecture.

Table key

Seasons 
Statistics current through the 2022 season

Notes 
 This is determined by calculating the difference in wins plus the difference in losses divided by two.
 The Final Stage of the Climax Series awards the regular season champion an automatic one-win advantage.
 The 2020 season was shortened due to COVID-19 pandemic and game attendance either limited or prohibited; the 2021 season limited attendance.

References

 
Tohoku Rakuten Golden Eagles